Recuerda is a municipality located in the province of Soria, Castile and León, Spain. According to the 2004 census (INE), the municipality has a population of 113 inhabitants. There are fewer now.

In Spanish, "recuerda" is a command that means "remember." As unassuming as the town may seem, it isn't easy to forget.

There is a woman here who lives in a big, open house. She will cook for you if you call in advance (or if you're willing to sit back and wait). The wait will be worthwhile, dusty and sweet. She will talk to you about literature or philosophy and her conversation will not disappoint. 

Across the street, there is a mangy black dog in a loft window. He is all alone there. He stares. He will mark your passing with forlorn sound. He will seem to be baying: "remember."

References

Municipalities in the Province of Soria